The Suitor is a 1962 French comedy film directed by and starring Pierre Étaix. It was entered into the 13th Berlin International Film Festival and the 3rd Moscow International Film Festival.

Cast
 Pierre Étaix as Pierre, the Suitor
 Laurence Lignères as Laurence
 Claude Massot as Father
 Denise Péronne as Mother (as Denise Perrone)
 Karin Vesely as Ilka
 France Arnel as Stella
 Lucien Frégis as The Painter

References

External links

1962 films
1962 comedy films
1960s French-language films
French comedy films
French black-and-white films
Louis Delluc Prize winners
Films directed by Pierre Étaix
Films with screenplays by Jean-Claude Carrière
1960s French films